The 1993–94 Georgian Cup (also known as the David Kipiani Cup) was the fiftieth season overall and fourth since independence of the Georgian annual football tournament.

First qualifying round 

|}

Second qualifying round 

|}

Round of 32 

|}

Round of 16 

|}

Quarterfinals 

|}

Semifinals 

|}

Final

See also 
 1993–94 Umaglesi Liga
 1993–94 Pirveli Liga

References

External links 
 The Rec.Sport.Soccer Statistics Foundation.

Georgian Cup seasons
Cup
Georgian Cup, 1993-94